Walter "Walo" Hörning (7 September 1910 – 18 January 1986) was a Swiss fencer. He competed in the individual and team foil events at the 1948 Summer Olympics.

References

External links
 

1910 births
1986 deaths
Swiss male foil fencers
Olympic fencers of Switzerland
Fencers at the 1948 Summer Olympics